The Karolinska University Hospital is a teaching hospital affiliated with Karolinska Institutet in Stockholm, Sweden, with two major sites in the municipalities of Solna and Huddinge. The hospital network is the second largest in Sweden, after Sahlgrenska University Hospital.

The present day Karolinska University Hospital is the result of a 2004 merger between the former Huddinge University Hospital (Huddinge universitetssjukhus) in Huddinge, south of Stockholm, and the Karolinska Hospital (Karolinska sjukhuset) in Solna, north of Stockholm. The new hospital has about 15,000 employees and 1,340 patient beds. The Karolinska University Hospital is closely affiliated with the Karolinska Institutet. It incorporates the Astrid Lindgren Children's hospital in Solna and the Children's Hospital in Huddinge.

The Karolinska University Hospital in Solna is being replaced by the New Karolinska Solna University Hospital.

New Karolinska Solna 

The New Karolinska Solna University Hospital (NKS), is the new university hospital built in Solna, Sweden, replacing the old Karolinska University Hospital buildings in Solna.

In April 2008, the decision was made by the Stockholm County Council to build a new university hospital in Stockholm. To construct a new hospital has been considered to be more cost effective, compared to renovating and refurbishing the present facilities, spread over a large area in more than 40 buildings. In June 2008, it was decided that the new university hospital will be built using a public–private partnership 
model which includes also financing as well as management of the building after the completion.

The project, however, was met with controversy, and the process for planning and building the hospital has been heavily criticized for poor construction planning, execution, management and corruption.

The first departments to move into the new hospital building in 2016 were those associated with the cardiovascular theme and the pediatric unit of the children's and women's health theme. All the other departments were expected to move into the new hospital building by the end of 2018.

It is one of the most expensive buildings in the world.

Gallery

See also 
Sahlgrenska University Hospital
Uppsala University Hospital
Umeå University Hospital

References

External links 
 Karolinska University Hospital 
 Karolinska Universitetssjukhuset
The New Karolinska Solna University Hospital

Hospitals established in 2004
Hospitals in Stockholm
Teaching hospitals in Sweden
2004 establishments in Sweden